Choquequirao Puquio (possibly from Quechua chuqi metal, every kind of precious metal / gold (<Aymara), k'iraw crip, cot, pukyu spring, well) is an archaeological site in Peru. It is situated in the Cusco Region, Cusco Province, San Sebastián District, north of San Sebastián.

See also 
 Inkilltambo

References 

Archaeological sites in Peru
Archaeological sites in Cusco Region